Pravdić is a surname. Notable people with the surname include:

 Aleksandar Pravdić (born 1958), Serbian politician
 Vlado Pravdić (born 1949), Bosnian musician

Serbian surnames